Lucila Godoy Alcayaga (7 April 1889 – 10 January 1957), known by her pseudonym Gabriela Mistral, was a Chilean poet-diplomat, educator and humanist. In 1945 she became the first Latin American author  to receive a Nobel Prize in Literature, "for her lyric poetry which, inspired by powerful emotions, has made her name a symbol of the idealistic aspirations of the entire Latin American world". Some central themes in her poems are nature, betrayal, love, a mother's love, sorrow and recovery, travel, and Latin American identity as formed from a mixture of Native American and European influences. Her portrait also appears on the 5,000 Chilean peso bank note.

Early life

Mistral was born in Vicuña, Chile, but was raised in the small Andean village of Montegrande, where she attended a primary school taught by her older sister, Emelina Molina. She respected her sister greatly, despite the many financial problems that Emelina brought her in later years. Her father, Juan Gerónimo Godoy Villanueva, was also a schoolteacher. He abandoned the family before she was three years old, and died, alone since estranged from the family, in 1911. Throughout her early years she was never far from poverty. By age fifteen, she was supporting herself and her mother, Petronila Alcayaga, a seamstress, by working as a teacher's aide in the seaside town of Compañia Baja, near La Serena, Chile.

In 1904 Mistral published some early poems, such as Ensoñaciones ("Dreams"), Carta Íntima ("Intimate Letter") and Junto al Mar ("By the Sea"), in the local newspaper El Coquimbo: Diario Radical, and La Voz de Elqui using a range of pseudonyms and variations on her civil name.

In 1906, Mistral met a railway worker, Romelio Ureta, her first love, who killed himself in 1909. Shortly after, her second love married someone else. This heartbreak was reflected in her early poetry and earned Mistral her first recognized literary work in 1914 with Sonnets on Death (Sonetos de la muerte). She used a nom de plume as she feared that she may have lost her job as a teacher if her identity was known. Mistral was awarded first prize in a national literary contest Juegos Florales in the Chilean capital, Santiago. Writing about his suicide led the poet to consider death and life more broadly than previous generations of Latin American poets. While Mistral had passionate friendships with various men and women, and these impacted her writings, she was secretive about her emotional life.

She had been using the pen name Gabriela Mistral since June 1908 for much of her writing. After winning the Juegos Florales she infrequently used her given name of Lucila Godoy for her publications. She formed her pseudonym from the names of two of her favorite poets, Gabriele D'Annunzio and Frédéric Mistral or, as another story has it, from a composite of the Archangel Gabriel and the mistral wind of Provence.

In 1922, Mistral released her first book, Desolation (Desolación), with the help of the Director of Hispanic Institute of New York,  Federico de Onis. It was a collection of poems that encompassed motherhood, religion, nature, morality and love of children. Her personal sorrow was present in the poems and her International reputation was established. Her work was a turn from modernism in Latin America and was marked by critics as direct, yet simplistic. In 1924, she released her second book, Tenderness (Ternura).

Career as an educator

In her adolescence, the need for teachers was so great, and the number of trained teachers was so small, especially in the rural areas, that anyone who was willing could find work as a teacher. Access to good schools was difficult, however, and the young woman lacked the political and social connections necessary to attend the Normal School: She was turned down, without explanation, in 1907. She later identified the obstacle to her entry as the school's chaplain, Father Ignacio Munizaga, who was aware of her publications in the local newspapers, her advocacy of liberalizing education and giving greater access to the schools to all social classes.

Although her formal education had ended by 1900, she was able to get work as a teacher thanks to her older sister, Emelina, who had likewise begun as a teacher's aide and was responsible for much of the poet's early education. The poet was able to rise from one post to another because of her publications in local and national newspapers and magazines. Her willingness to move was also a factor. Between the years 1906 and 1912 she had taught, successively, in three schools near La Serena, then in Barrancas, then Traiguén in 1910, and in Antofagasta in the desert north, in 1911. By 1912 she had moved to work in a liceo, or high school, in Los Andes, where she stayed for six years and often visited Santiago. In 1918 Pedro Aguirre Cerda, then Minister of Education and a future president of Chile, promoted her appointment to direct the Sara Braun Lyceum in Punta Arenas. She moved on to Temuco in 1920, then to Santiago, where in 1921, she defeated a candidate connected with the Radical Party, Josefina Dey del Castillo, to be named director of Santiago's Liceo #6, the country's newest and most prestigious girls' school.
Controversies over the nomination of Gabriela Mistral to the highly coveted post in Santiago were among the factors that made her decide to accept an invitation to work in Mexico in 1922, with that country's Minister of Education, José Vasconcelos. He had her join in the nation's plan to reform libraries and schools, to start a national education system. That year she published Desolación in New York, which further promoted the international acclaim she had already been receiving thanks to her journalism and public speaking. Later she published Lecturas para Mujeres (Readings for Women), a collection of texts in prose and verse that celebrate the education of girls. She included works by both Latin American and European writers.

Following almost two years in Mexico she traveled to Washington D.C., where she addressed the Pan American Union, went on to New York, then toured Europe: In Madrid she published Ternura (Tenderness), a collection of lullabies and rondas written for an audience of children, parents, and other poets. In early 1925 she returned to Chile, where she formally retired from the nation's education system, and received a pension. It wasn't a moment too soon: The legislature had just agreed to the demands of the teachers union, headed by Mistral's rival, Amanda Labarca Hubertson, that only university-trained teachers should be given posts in the schools. The University of Chile had granted her the academic title of Spanish Professor in 1923, although her formal education ended before she was 12 years old. Her autodidacticism was remarkable, a testimony to the flourishing culture of newspapers, magazines, and books in provincial Chile, as well as to her personal determination and verbal genius. 

The poet Pablo Neruda, Chile's second Nobel Prize recipient, met Mistral when she moved to his hometown of Temuco. She read his poems and recommended reading for him. They became lifelong friends.

International work and recognition

Mistral's international stature made it highly unlikely that she would remain in Chile. In mid-1925 she was invited to represent Latin America in the newly formed Institute for Intellectual Cooperation of the League of Nations. With her relocation to France in early 1926 she was effectively an exile for the rest of her life. She made a living, at first, from journalism and then giving lectures in the United States and in Latin America, including Puerto Rico. She variously toured the Caribbean, Brazil, Uruguay, and Argentina, among other places.

Mistral lived primarily in France and Italy between 1926 and 1932. During these years she worked for the League for Intellectual Cooperation of the League of Nations, attending conferences of women and educators throughout Europe and occasionally in the Americas. She held a visiting professorship at Barnard College of Columbia University in 1930–1931, worked briefly at Middlebury College and Vassar College in 1931, and was warmly received at the University of Puerto Rico at Rio Piedras, where she variously gave conferences or wrote, in 1931, 1932, and 1933.

Like many Latin American artists and intellectuals, Mistral served as a consul from 1932 until her death, working in Naples, Madrid, Lisbon, Nice, Petrópolis, Los Angeles, Santa Barbara, Veracruz,  Rapallo, and New York City. As consul in Madrid, she had occasional professional interactions with another Chilean consul and Nobel Prize recipient, Pablo Neruda, and she was among the earlier writers to recognize the importance and originality of his work, which she had known while he was a teenager and she was school director in his hometown of Temuco.

She published hundreds of articles in magazines and newspapers throughout the Spanish-speaking world. Among her confidants were Eduardo Santos, President of Colombia, all of the elected Presidents of Chile from 1922 to her death in 1957, Eduardo Frei Montalva, who would be elected president in 1964, and Eleanor Roosevelt.

The poet's second major volume of poetry, Tala, appeared in 1938, published in Buenos Aires with the help of longtime friend and correspondent Victoria Ocampo. The proceeds for the sale were devoted to children orphaned by the Spanish Civil War. This volume includes many poems celebrating the customs and folklore of Latin America as well as Mediterranean Europe. Mistral uniquely fuses these locales and concerns, a reflection of her identification as "una mestiza de vasco," her European Basque-Indigenous Amerindian background.

On 14 August 1943, Mistral's 17-year-old nephew, Juan Miguel Godoy, killed himself. Mistral considered Juan Miguel as a son and she called him Yin Yin. The grief of this death, as well as her responses to tensions of World War II and then the Cold War in Europe and the Americas, are all reflected in the last volume of poetry published in her lifetime, Lagar, which appeared in a truncated form in 1954. A final volume of poetry, Poema de Chile, was edited posthumously by her partner Doris Dana and published in 1967. Poema de Chile describes the poet's return to Chile after death, in the company of an Indian boy from the Atacama desert and an Andean deer, the huemul. This collection of poetry anticipates the interests in objective description and re-vision of the epic tradition just then becoming evident among poets of the Americas, all of whom Mistral read carefully.

On 15 November 1945, Mistral became the first Latin American, and fifth woman, to receive the Nobel Prize in Literature. She received the award in person from King Gustav of Sweden on 10 December 1945. In 1947 she received a doctor honoris causa from Mills College, Oakland, California. In 1951 she was awarded the National Literature Prize in Chile.

Poor health somewhat slowed Mistral's traveling. During the last years of her life she made her home in the town of Roslyn, New York; in early January 1957 she transferred to Hempstead, New York, where she died from pancreatic cancer on 10 January 1957, aged 67. Her remains were returned to Chile nine days later. The Chilean government declared three days of national mourning, and hundreds of thousands of mourners came to pay her their respects.

Some of Mistral's best known poems include Piececitos de Niño, Balada, Todas Íbamos a ser Reinas, La Oración de la Maestra, El Ángel Guardián, Decálogo del Artista and La Flor del Aire. She wrote and published some 800 essays in magazines and newspapers; she was also a well-known correspondent and highly regarded orator both in person and over the radio.

Mistral may be most widely quoted in English for Su Nombre es Hoy (His Name is Today):

Characteristics of her work

Mistral's work is characterized by including gray tones in her literature; sadness and bitterness are recurrent feelings on it. These are evoked in her writings as the reflection of a hard childhood, plagued by deprivation coupled with a lack of affection in her home. However, since her youth as a teacher in a rural school, Gabriela Mistral had a great affection for children that shows throughout her writing. Religion was also reflected in her literature as Catholicism had great influence in her life.  Nevertheless, she always reflected a more neutral stance regarding the concept of religion.  Thus we can find the religious combined with feelings of love and piety, making her into one of the worthiest representatives of Latin American literature of twentieth century.

Death, posthumous tributes and legacy 
During the 1970s and 1980s, the image of Gabriela Mistral was appropriated by the military dictatorship of Pinochet presenting her as a symbol of "submission to the authority" and "social order". Views of her as a saint-like celibate and suffering heterosexual woman were first challenged by author Licia Fiol-Matta who contends that she was rather a lesbian. The suspicions about her eventual lesbianism were reaffirmed with the  discovery of her archive in 2007, after the death of her claimed last romantic partner, Doris Dana, in 2006. Dana had kept thousands of documents, including letters between Mistral and her various occasional female lovers. The publication of the letters she wrote to Dana herself in the volume Niña errante (2007), edited by Pedro Pablo Zegers, reaffirmed the idea that the two had a long-lasting romantic relationship that supported Mistral in her latest years. The letters were translated into English by Velma García and published by University of New Mexico Press in 2018. Regardless of these hypotheses about the claimed romance between them, Doris Dana, who was 31 years younger than Mistral, denied explicitly in her last interview that her relationship with Mistral was romantic or erotic, and described it as the relationship between a stepmother and her stepdaughter. Dana denied being lesbian and in her opinion it is unlikely that Gabriela Mistral was lesbian.
Mistral had diabetes and heart problems. Eventually she died of pancreatic cancer in Hempstead Hospital in New York City on 10 January 1957, at 67 years of age, with Doris Dana by her side.

Themes 
Gabriela Mistral has been an influential part for Latin American Poetry. A powerful speech given by a member of the Swedish Academy, a Swedish writer Hjalmar Gullberg set the stage to understand the perspective and the emotions of who is Gabriela Mistral. Discussing how the first foreign verses of French poet Frédéric Mistral were not able to be understood by his own mother, Gulberg explained how the old language of troubadours became the language of poetry. Ten years later with the birth of Gabriela Mistral, the language of the poets will continue to thrive and be heard for many years to come. The voice emitted from the mouth of Gabriela Mistral was able to shake the world and create a dent to society that opened the eyes and cleared the ears of those who are willing to hear her voice.

Gullberg states, “she lifted her cry to the Heaven[1]…”, after experiencing the loss of her first love through suicide the young poet became Gabriela Mistral and her poetic words would begin to spread over all South America and other parts of the world. Since very little is known of her first love, we do know that his death helped to create Mistral's poems filled with themes of death and despair, perhaps hatred toward God. In memory of her first love and later after the loss of a nephew who she loved like a son her collection of poems titled Desolación, would begin to impact many others. The fifteenth poem found in Desolación, shed tears for the loss of a child that will never be born to that of a dead man. These tears are commonly shed from the eyes of parents who love their children but suffer having them be taken away so soon, theme of loss for those who are loved.

Themes of death, desolation and loss do not entirely fill the pages of Gabriela Mistral's books. Other themes such as love and motherhood, not just the love for her beloved railroad employee and nephew (son), were transferred to the very children she taught. It comes to no surprise that the name of her collection of songs and rounds is titled Ternura, to express her feelings of love she has for the children of her school. Printed in Madrid in 1924, her next collection of love filled words was felt and well received by four thousand Mexican children who would honor her by singing her very own collection of heart-felt words. Thanks to the hard work and profound dedication to her children she became known as the poet of motherhood.

Having lived through two world wars and many other violent wars, paved the path for a third large collection, Tala (a title that was said to mean “ravage” by Gullberg). The poems in Tala contains a mixture of sacred hymn naïve song for children, poems that talk about water, corn, salt and wine. Gullberg continues to pay homage to Gabriela Mistral, who he says has become the great singer of sorrow and motherhood for Latin America. Gabriela Mistral's wonderful collections of poems and songs have created an atmosphere that expresses her care for children and all her sorrows that she has had to endure throughout her years as a teacher and a poet for Latin America. Themes of sorrow and motherhood that can be felt with every word that is expressed in her work.

Awards and honors
1914: Juegos Florales, Sonetos de la Muerte
1945: Nobel Prize in Literature
1951: Chilean National Prize for Literature

The Venezuelan writer and diplomat who worked under the name Lucila Palacios took her nom de plume in honour of Mistral's original name.

Works

 1914: Sonetos de la muerte ("Sonnets of Death")
 1922: Desolación ("Despair"), including "Decalogo del artista", New York : Instituto de las Españas
 1923: Lecturas para Mujeres ("Readings for Women")
 1924: Ternura: canciones de niños, Madrid: Saturnino Calleja
 1934: Nubes Blancas y Breve Descripción de Chile (1934)
 1938: Tala ("Harvesting"), Buenos Aires: Sur
 1941: Antología: Selección de Gabriela Mistral, Santiago, Chile: Zig Zag
 1952: Los sonetos de la muerte y otros poemas elegíacos, Santiago, Chile: Philobiblion
 1954: Lagar, Santiago, Chile
 1957: Recados: Contando a Chile, Santiago, Chile: Editorial del PacíficoCroquis mexicanos; Gabriela Mistral en México, México City: Costa-Amic
 1958: Poesías completas, Madrid : Aguilar
 1967: Poema de Chile ("Poem of Chile"), published posthumously
 1992: Lagar II, published posthumously, Santiago, Chile: Biblioteca Nacional

Works translated into other languages

English
Several selections of Mistral's poetry have been published in English translation, including those by Doris Dana,
Langston Hughes,
and Ursula K. Le Guin.

Nepali
Some of Mistral's poems are translated into Nepali by Suman Pokhrel, and collected in an anthology titled Manpareka Kehi Kavita.

Bengali
A collection of poetry and some proses are translated in Bengali in India in 2016. The collection named Banglay Gabriela mistral, sahitye Nobel praptir 70 bochor purti upolokkhye nirbachita rachanasangraha. Gabriela mistral en Bengali Obras seleccionadas a 70 anos del Premio Nobel de Literatura.

See also

 Barnard College, repository for part of Mistral's personal library, given by Doris Dana in 1978.
 Land of poets
 List of female Nobel laureates

References

External links
bengali tanslation Gabriela Mistral by moom rahman

 Gabriela Mistral's heritage 
 
 Life and Poetry of Gabriela Mistral
 
 Gabriela Mistral Foundation
 Gabriela Mistral Poems
 List of Works
 Gabriela Mistral – University of Chile 
 About her Basque origin 
 Gabriela Mistral (1889–1957) – Memoria Chilena
 Gabriela Mistral reads eighteen poems from her collected volumes: Ternura, Lagar, and Tala. Recorded at Library of Congress, Hispanic Division on December 12, 1950. 
 
 Gabriela Mistral Papers, 1911–1949

1889 births
1957 deaths
People from Elqui Province
Chilean people of Basque descent
Chilean people of Diaguita descent
Deaths from cancer in New York (state)
Chilean women diplomats
Chilean diplomats
Chilean emigrants to the United States
Chilean Nobel laureates
Chilean schoolteachers
Mestizo writers
Deaths from pancreatic cancer
Chilean feminist writers
Nobel laureates in Literature
People from Hempstead (village), New York
Women Nobel laureates
National Prize for Literature (Chile) winners
Pseudonymous women writers
Postmodern writers
20th-century Chilean women writers
20th-century Chilean poets
Chilean women poets
Columbia University faculty
20th-century pseudonymous writers
Chilean academics